Crataegus, commonly called hawthorn, quickthorn, thornapple, May-tree, whitethorn, Mayflower, or hawberry, is a genus of several hundred species of shrubs and trees in the family Rosaceae, native to temperate regions of the Northern Hemisphere in Europe, Asia, North Africa, and North America. The name "hawthorn" was originally applied to the species native to northern Europe, especially the common hawthorn C. monogyna, and the unmodified name is often so used in Britain and Ireland. The name is now also applied to the entire genus and to the related Asian genus Rhaphiolepis.

Etymology
The generic epithet, Crataegus, is derived from the Greek  "strength" because of the great strength of the wood and  "sharp", referring to the thorns of some species. The name haw, originally an Old English term for hedge (from the Anglo-Saxon term , "a fence with thorns"), also applies to the fruit.

Description

The most common type of bark is smooth grey in young individuals, developing shallow longitudinal fissures with narrow ridges in older trees. The leaves grow spirally arranged on long shoots, and in clusters on spur shoots on the branches or twigs. The leaves of most species have lobed or serrated margins and are somewhat variable in shape. The fruit, sometimes known as a "haw", is berry-like but structurally a pome containing from one to five pyrenes that resemble the "stones" of plums, peaches, etc., which are drupaceous fruit in the same subfamily.

Taxonomy
The number of species in the genus depends on taxonomic interpretation. Some botanists in the past recognised 1000 or more species, many of which are apomictic microspecies. A reasonable number is estimated to be 200 species. The genus likely first appeared in the Eocene, with the ancestral area likely being Eastern North America and in Europe, which at that time remained closely linked due to the North Atlantic Land Bridge. The earliest known leaves of the genus from the Eocene of North America, with the earliest leaves from Europe being from the Oligocene.

The genus is classified into sections which are further divided into series. Series Montaninsulae has not yet been assigned to a section. The sections are:
section Brevispinae
section Crataegus
section Coccineae
section Cuneatae
section Douglasia
section Hupehensis
section Macracanthae
section Sanguineae

Selected species

Crataegus aemula – Rome hawthorn
Crataegus aestivalis – May hawthorn
Crataegus alabamensis – Alabama hawthorn
Crataegus altaica – Altai hawthorn
Crataegus ambigua – Russian hawthorn
Crataegus ambitiosa – Grand Rapids hawthorn
Crataegus anamesa – Fort Bend hawthorn
Crataegus ancisa – Mississippi hawthorn
Crataegus annosa – Phoenix City hawthorn
Crataegus aprica – sunny hawthorn
Crataegus arborea – Montgomery hawthorn
Crataegus arcana – Carolina hawthorn
Crataegus ater – Nashville hawthorn
Crataegus austromontana – valley head hawthorn
Crataegus azarolus – Azarole hawthorn
Crataegus berberifolia – barberry hawthorn
Crataegus biltmoreana – Biltmore hawthorn
Crataegus boyntonii – stinking hawthorn
Crataegus brachyacantha – blueberry hawthorn
Crataegus brainerdii – Brainerd's hawthorn
Crataegus calpodendron – late hawthorn
Crataegus canbyi
Crataegus chlorosarca
Crataegus chrysocarpa – fireberry hawthorn
Crataegus coccinea – scarlet hawthorn
Crataegus coccinioides – Kansas hawthorn
Crataegus collina – hillside hawthorn
Crataegus crus-galli – cockspur hawthorn
Crataegus cuneata – Japanese hawthorn
Crataegus cupulifera
Crataegus dahurica
Crataegus dilatata – broadleaf hawthorn, Apple-leaf hawthorn
Crataegus douglasii – black hawthorn, Douglas hawthorn
Crataegus ellwangeriana
Crataegus erythropoda – cerro hawthorn
Crataegus flabellata – Gray's hawthorn, fanleaf hawthorn
Crataegus flava – yellow-fruited hawthorn
Crataegus fluviatilis
Crataegus fontanesiana
Crataegus greggiana – Gregg's hawthorn
Crataegus harbisonii – Harbison's hawthorn
Crataegus heldreichii
Crataegus heterophylla – various-leaved hawthorn
Crataegus holmesiana – Holmes' hawthorn
Crataegus hupehensis
Crataegus intricata – thicket hawthorn, intricate hawthorn
Crataegus iracunda – stolon–bearing hawthorn
Crataegus jackii
Crataegus jonesae
Crataegus kansuensis – Gansu hawthorn
Crataegus laevigata – Midland hawthorn, English hawthorn
Crataegus lassa – sandhill hawthorn
Crataegus lepida
Crataegus macrosperma – big-fruit hawthorn
Crataegus marshallii – parsley-leaved hawthorn
Crataegus maximowiczii
Crataegus mercerensis
Crataegus mexicana – tejocote, Mexican hawthorn
Crataegus mollis – downy hawthorn
Crataegus monogyna – common hawthorn, oneseed hawthorn
Crataegus nigra – Hungarian hawthorn
Crataegus okanaganensis – Okanagan Valley hawthorn
Crataegus opaca – western mayhaw
Crataegus orientalis – oriental hawthorn
Crataegus pedicellata – scarlet hawthorn
Crataegus pennsylvanica – Pennsylvania thorn
Crataegus pentagyna – small-flowered black hawthorn
Crataegus peregrina
Crataegus persimilis – plumleaf hawthorn
Crataegus phaenopyrum – Washington hawthorn
Crataegus phippsii
Crataegus pinnatifida – Chinese hawthorn
Crataegus populnea – poplar hawthorn
Crataegus pratensis – prairie hawthorn
Crataegus pruinosa – frosted hawthorn
Crataegus pulcherrima – beautiful hawthorn
Crataegus punctata – dotted hawthorn, white hawthorn: sometimes claimed as the state flower of Missouri, though the legislation does not specify a species
Crataegus purpurella – Loch Lomond hawthorn
Crataegus putnamiana
Crataegus pycnoloba
Crataegus reverchonii – Reverchon's hawthorn
Crataegus rhipidophylla
Crataegus rivularis – river hawthorn
Crataegus saligna – willow hawthorn
Crataegus sanguinea – redhaw hawthorn, Siberian hawthorn
Crataegus sargentii – Sargent's hawthorn
Crataegus scabrida – rough hawthorn
Crataegus scabrifolia
Crataegus songarica
Crataegus spathulata – littlehip hawthorn
Crataegus submollis – Quebec hawthorn
Crataegus succulenta – fleshy hawthorn
Crataegus tanacetifolia – tansy–leaved thorn
Crataegus texana – Texas hawthorn
Crataegus tracyi – Tracy hawthorn
Crataegus triflora – three-flowered hawthorn
Crataegus uniflora – one-flowered hawthorn, dwarf hawthorn
Crataegus viridis – green hawthorn, including cultivar 'Winter King'
Crataegus visenda
Crataegus vulsa – Alabama hawthorn
Crataegus wattiana – Altai hawthorn
Crataegus wilsonii – Wilson hawthorn

Selected hybrids
Crataegus × ariifolia (= C. ariaefolia)
Crataegus × dsungarica
Crataegus × grignonensis – Grignon hawthorn, an unpublished name
Crataegus × lavalleei – Lavallée hawthorn, including Crataegus × carrierei
Crataegus × macrocarpa
Crataegus × media – the name for C. monogyna–C. laevigata hybrids
Crataegus × mordenensis – Morden hawthorn, including 'Toba' and 'Snowbird'
Crataegus × sinaica – za'rur
Crataegus × smithiana – red Mexican hawthorn, an unpublished name
Crataegus × vailiae

Ecology
Hawthorns provide food and shelter for many species of birds and mammals, and the flowers are important for many nectar-feeding insects. Hawthorns are also used as food plants by the larvae of a large number of Lepidoptera species, such as the small eggar moth, E. lanestris. Haws are important for wildlife in winter, particularly thrushes and waxwings; these birds eat the haws and disperse the seeds in their droppings.

Uses

Culinary use

The "haws" or fruits of the common hawthorn, C. monogyna, are edible. In the United Kingdom, they are sometimes used to make a jelly or homemade wine. The leaves are edible, and if picked in spring when still young, are tender enough to be used in salads. The young leaves and flower buds, which are also edible, are known as "bread and cheese" in rural England. In the southern United States, fruits of three native species are collectively known as mayhaws and are made into jellies which are considered a delicacy. The Kutenai people of northwestern North America used red and black hawthorn fruit for food.

On Manitoulin Island, Ontario, some red-fruited species are called hawberries. During colonization, European settlers ate these fruits during the winter as the only remaining food supply. People born on the island are now called "haweaters".

The fruits of Crataegus mexicana are known in Mexico as tejocotes and are eaten raw, cooked, or in jam during the winter. They are stuffed in the piñatas broken during the traditional pre-Christmas celebration known as Las Posadas. They are also cooked with other fruits to prepare a Christmas punch. The mixture of tejocote paste, sugar, and chili powder produces a popular Mexican candy called rielitos, which is manufactured by several brands.

The 4 cm fruits of the species Crataegus pinnatifida (Chinese hawthorn) are tart, bright red, and resemble small crabapple fruits. They are used to make many kinds of Chinese snacks, including haw flakes and being coated in sugar syrup and put on a stick tanghulu. The fruits, which are called 山楂 shān zhā in Chinese, are also used to produce jams, jellies, juices, alcoholic beverages, and other drinks; these could in turn be used in other dishes (for instance, many older recipes for Cantonese sweet and sour sauce call for shānzhā jam). In South Korea, a liquor called sansachun (산사춘) is made from the fruits.

In Iran, the fruits of Crataegus (including Crataegus azarolus var. aronia, as well as other species) are known as zâlzâlak and eaten raw as a snack, or made into a jam known by the same name.

The fruits of North America's Crataegus greggiana are made into preserves.

Research
A 2008 Cochrane Collaboration meta-analysis of previous studies concluded that evidence exists of "a significant benefit in symptom control and physiologic outcomes" for an extract of hawthorn used as an adjuvant in treating chronic heart failure. A 2010 review concluded that "Crataegus [hawthorn] preparations hold significant potential as a useful remedy in the treatment of cardiovascular disease". The review indicated the need for further study of the best dosages and concluded that although "many different theoretical interactions between Crataegus and orthodox medications have been postulated ... none have [yet] been substantiated.

Phytochemicals found in hawthorn include tannins, flavonoids, oligomeric proanthocyanidins, and phenolic acids.

Traditional medicine
Several species of hawthorn have been used in traditional medicine. The products used are often derived from C. monogyna, C. laevigata, or related Crataegus species, "collectively known as hawthorn", not necessarily distinguishing between these species. The dried fruits of Crataegus pinnatifida (called shān zhā in Chinese) are used in traditional Chinese medicine, primarily as a digestive aid. A closely related species, Crataegus cuneata (Japanese hawthorn, called sanzashi in Japanese) is used in a similar manner. Other species (especially Crataegus laevigata) are used in herbal medicine where the plant is believed to strengthen cardiovascular function.

The Kutenai people of northwestern North America used black hawthorn fruit (Kutenai language: kaǂa; approximate pronunciation: kasha) for food, and red hawthorn fruit (Kutenai language: ǂupǂi; approximate pronunciation: shupshi) in traditional medicine.

Side effects
Overdose can cause cardiac arrhythmia and low blood pressure, while milder side effects include nausea and dizziness. Patients taking digoxin should avoid taking hawthorn.

Landscaping
Many species and hybrids are used as ornamental and street trees. The common hawthorn is extensively used in Europe as a hedge plant. During the British Agricultural Revolution in the eighteenth and nineteenth centuries, hawthorn saplings were mass propagated in nurseries to create the new field boundaries required by the Inclosure Acts. Several cultivars of the Midland hawthorn C. laevigata have been selected for their pink or red flowers. Hawthorns are among the trees most recommended for water conservation landscapes.

Grafting

Hawthorn can be used as a rootstock in the practice of grafting. It is graft-compatible with Mespilus (medlar), and with pear, and makes a hardier rootstock than quince, but the thorny suckering habit of the hawthorn can be problematic.

Seedlings of Crataegus monogyna have been used to graft multiple species on the same trunk, such as pink hawthorn, pear tree, and medlar, the result being trees which give pink and white flowers in May and fruits during the summer. "Chip budding" has also been performed on hawthorn trunks to have branches of several varieties on the same tree. Such trees can be seen in Vigo, Spain, and in the northwest of France (mainly in Brittany).

Bonsai
Many species of Hawthorn make excellent bonsai trees. They are grown and enjoyed for their display of flowers.

Other uses
The wood of some Crataegus species is hard and resistant to rot. In rural North America, it was prized for use as tool handles and fence posts. First Nations people of western Canada used the thorns for durable fish hooks and minor skin surgeries.

Folklore
The Scots saying "Ne'er cast a cloot til Mey's oot" conveys a warning not to shed any cloots (clothes) before the summer has fully arrived and the Mayflowers (hawthorn blossoms) are in full bloom.

The custom of employing the flowering branches for decorative purposes on 1 May is of very early origin, but since the adoption of the Gregorian calendar in 1752, the tree has rarely been in full bloom in England before the second week of that month. In the Scottish Highlands, the flowers may be seen as late as the middle of June. The hawthorn has been regarded as the emblem of hope, and its branches are stated to have been carried by the ancient Greeks in wedding processions, and to have been used by them to deck the altar of Hymenaios. The supposition that the tree was the source of Jesus's crown of thorns doubtless gave rise to the tradition among the French peasantry (current as late as 1911) that it utters groans and cries on Good Friday, and probably also to the old popular superstition in Great Britain and Ireland that ill luck attended the uprooting of hawthorns. Branches of Glastonbury thorn (C. monogyna 'Biflora', sometimes called C. oxyacantha var. praecox), which flowers both in December and in spring, were formerly highly valued in England, on account of the legend that the tree was originally the staff of Joseph of Arimathea.

Robert Graves, in his book The White Goddess, traces and reinterprets many European legends and myths in which the whitethorn (hawthorn), also called the May-tree, is central.

In Celtic lore, the hawthorn plant was used commonly for inscriptions along with yew and apple. It was once said to heal the broken heart. In Ireland, the red fruit is, or was, called the Johnny MacGorey or Magory.

Serbian folklore that spread across Balkan notes that hawthorn (Serbian глог or glog) is essential to kill vampires, and stakes used for their slaying must be made from the wood of the thorn tree.

In Gaelic folklore, hawthorn (in Scottish Gaelic, sgitheach and in Irish, sceach) 'marks the entrance to the otherworld' and is strongly associated with the fairies. Lore has it that it is very unlucky to cut the tree at any time other than when it is in bloom; however, during this time, it is commonly cut and decorated as a May bush (see Beltane). This warning persists to modern times; it has been questioned by folklorist Bob Curran whether the ill luck of the DeLorean Motor Company was associated with the destruction of a fairy thorn to make way for a production facility.

The superstitious dread of harming hawthorn trees prevalent in the British Isles may also be connected to an old belief that hawthorns, and more especially 'lone thorns' (self-seeded specimens standing in isolation from other trees) originate from lightning or thunderbolts and give protection from lightning strikes.

Hawthorn trees are often found beside clootie wells; at these types of holy wells, they are sometimes known as rag trees, for the strips of cloth which are tied to them as part of healing rituals. 'When all fruit fails, welcome haws' was once a common expression in Ireland.

According to a medieval legend, the Glastonbury thorn, C. monogyna 'Biflora', which flowers twice annually, was supposed to have miraculously grown from a walking stick planted by Joseph of Arimathea at Glastonbury in Somerset, England. The original tree was destroyed in the sixteenth century during the English Reformation, but several cultivars have survived. Since the reign of King James I, it has been a Christmas custom to send a sprig of Glastonbury thorn flowers to the Sovereign, which is used to decorate the royal family's dinner table.

In the Victorian era, the hawthorn represented hope in the language of flowers.

The hawthorn – species unspecified – is the state flower of Missouri. The legislation designating it as such was introduced by Sarah Lucille Turner, one of the first two women to serve in the Missouri House of Representatives.

Propagation
Although it is commonly stated that hawthorns can be propagated by cutting, this is difficult to achieve with rootless stem pieces. Small plants or suckers are often transplanted from the wild. Seeds require stratification and take one or two years to germinate. Seed germination is improved if the pyrenes that contain the seed are subjected to extensive drying at room temperature, before stratification. Uncommon forms can be grafted onto seedlings of other species.

References

Additional reading 

 
Rosaceae genera
Medicinal plants
Taxa named by Joseph Pitton de Tournefort
Angiosperm genera
Edible plants